Historia Scientiarum is a triannual peer-reviewed academic journal published by the History of Science Society of Japan. It was established in 1962 as Japanese Studies in the History of Science and obtained its current title in 1980. The editor-in-chief is Takehiko Hashimoto (University of Tokyo, Komaba Campus). Articles can be written in English, German, or French. The journal is abstracted and indexed in Scopus.

References

External links 
 

History of science journals
Multilingual journals
Triannual journals
Publications established in 1962
Academic journals published by learned and professional societies